Thitarodes gonggaensis is a species of moth of the family Hepialidae. It was described by Fu and Huang in 1991, and is known from Sichuan, China.

References

External links
Hepialidae genera

Moths described in 1991
Hepialidae